Vadym Arkhypchuk (born 6 July 1937) is a Ukrainian sprinter. He competed in the men's 200 metres at the 1960 Summer Olympics representing the Soviet Union.

References

1937 births
Living people
Athletes (track and field) at the 1960 Summer Olympics
Athletes (track and field) at the 1964 Summer Olympics
Ukrainian male sprinters
Olympic athletes of the Soviet Union
Sportspeople from Kyiv
Soviet male sprinters